Ardore is a comune (municipality) in the Province of Reggio Calabria in the Italian region Calabria, located about  southwest of Catanzaro and about  east of Reggio Calabria.

Ardore borders the following municipalities: Benestare, Bovalino, Ciminà, Platì, Sant'Ilario dello Ionio.

Demographic evolution

References

External
Ardore Extractions-Hosts images of actual Vital Records of the residents of Ardore

Cities and towns in Calabria
Articles which contain graphical timelines